Hannah McLeod (1857–1912) was an Australian hospital matron.

She trained at Newcastle General Hospital. In 1893, she was appointed to Crown Street Women's Hospital. She was a member of Australasian Trained Nurses' Association In 1907 she testified before the New South Wales Parliament.

McLeod wrote a section on "The Early Rearing and Handling of Children" in Hannah Rankin's Handbook of Domestic Science.

References 

1857 births
1912 deaths
Australian nurses